Takia may refer to:
Ayesha Takia, India actress
Takia language
Takia people of Madang Province, Papua New Guinea
Bazmaghbiar, Armenia - formerly Takia
Takia, Iran, a village in Markazi Province, Iran
Takia (watercraft), a traditional watercraft of Fiji

See also 
Takiya (disambiguation)
Taqiyah (cap)